The Canibal mine is one of the largest titanium mines in Guatemala. The mine is located in Cuilco in Huehuetenango Department. The mine has reserves amounting to 50 million tonnes of ore grading 19.43% titanium.

References 

Titanium mines in Guatemala